Ali Asghar Hassanzadeh Navlighi (born 2 November 1987) is an Iranian professional futsal player. He is a Left Winger, and currently a member of Giti Pasand in the Iranian Futsal Super League and the Iran national futsal team. Hassanzadeh is regarded as one of the greatest Asian futsal players in history and has been named AFC Futsal Player of the Year four times (2014, 2016, 2017, and 2018) and was a nominee for World Futsal Player of the Year in 2015. He is also the all time top goalscorer of the AFC Futsal Club Championship with 33 goals.

Hassanzadeh is sponsored by Spanish brand Joma.

Career

Eram Kish
Born in Qom, Hassanzadeh started out playing for his local club Eram Kish Qom and signed his first professional contract with the club in 2004. In his first season with the club, Eram finished runners–up in the league.

Foolad Mahan
In the summer of 2009 Hassanzadeh left Eram and signed with champions Foolad Mahan. In his first season with the club Foolad won the league and the 2010 AFC Futsal Club Championship.

Al Rayyan (loan)
In 2011 Hassanzadeh was loaned out to Qatari side Al Rayyan for the duration of the 2011 AFC Futsal Club Championship, he was the top scorer of the tournament with ten goals and helped Al Rayyan to a fourth-place finish.

Saba
In 2012 Hassanzadeh returned Qom and signed with Saba Qom where he won the league in the 2012–13 season and was also named the top scorer of the league for the first time, with 28 goals in 24 games.

Norilsk Nickel
In 2013 Hassanzadeh accepted an offer from Russian club MFK Norilsk Nickel becoming one of three Iranian's playing for that club. Hassanzadeh scored 8 goals in 10 games for the club and left only after one season.

Tasisat Daryaei
He returned to Iran in 2015 and signed with champions Tasisat Daryaei, in his first season he was the leading scorer of the league with 29 goals and also helped the club win the double.

International career
Hassanzadeh made his debut with the Iran national futsal team in 2005 and won the AFC Futsal Championship for the first time in 2008. Hassanzadeh won the tournament with Iran again in 2010 and 2016 and finished runners up in 2014, he was named the best player in the 2014 and 2016 tournaments. Hassanzadeh has appeared in three World Cups with Iran (2008, 2012, and 2016), the most notable of which was 2016 where Hassanzadeh scored in Iran's historic Round of 16 win against Brazil.

Honours

Country 
 FIFA Futsal World Cup
 Third place (1): 2016
 AFC Futsal Championship
 Champion (4): 2008, 2010, 2016, 2018
 Runners-up (1):  2014
 Third place (1): 2012
 Asian Indoor and Martial Arts Games
 Champion (4): 2007, 2009, 2013, 2017
 Confederations Cup
 Champion (1): 2009
 Grand Prix
 Runners-up (2): 2009, 2015
 WAFF Futsal Championship
 Champion (2): 2007, 2012

Club 
 AFC Futsal Club Championship
 Champion (3): 2010 (Foolad Mahan), 2015 (Tasisat Daryaei), 2018 (Mes Sungun)
 Runners-up (1): 2017 (Giti Pasand)
 Iranian Futsal Super League
 Champion (3): 2009–10 (Foolad Mahan), 2015–16 (Tasisat Daryaei), 2016–17 (Giti Pasand)
 Runners-up (3): 2004–05 (Eram Kish), 2008–09 (Eram Kish), 2012–13 (Saba)

Individual 
 Asian Indoor Games top scorer: 2007 (12 goals)
 AFC Futsal Club Championship top scorer: 2011 (10 goals)
 Iranian Futsal Super League top scorer (2): 2012–13 (Saba) (28 goals), 2015–16 (Tasisat Daryaei) (29 goals)
 AFC Futsal Championship Most Valuable Player (3): 2014, 2016, 2018
 AFC Futsal Player of the Year: 2014, 2016, 2017, 2018
 AFC Futsal Club Championship Most Valuable Player (1): 2017
 Iranian Futsal Super League Best Player (1): 2016–17

References

External links
 
 

1987 births
Living people
People from Qom
Iranian men's futsal players
Futsal forwards
Almas Shahr Qom FSC players
Foolad Mahan FSC players
Tasisat Daryaei FSC players
Giti Pasand FSC players
Mes Sungun FSC players
Iranian expatriate futsal players
Iranian expatriate sportspeople in Qatar
Iranian expatriate sportspeople in Russia
Iranian expatriate sportspeople in China